William Sorell (1775 – 4 June 1848) was a soldier and third Lieutenant-Governor of Van Diemen's Land.

Early life
Sorell was born probably in the West Indies, the eldest son of Lieutenant-general William Alexander Sorell and his wife Jane. Sorell joined the British Army in August 1790 as an ensign with the 31st (Huntingdonshire) Regiment of Foot, was promoted lieutenant in August 1793, and saw active service in the West Indies, where he was seriously wounded. Sorell was promoted to captain in 1795. In 1799 he was aide-de-camp to Lieutenant-general Sir James Murray in the abortive expedition to North Holland, and in 1800 took part in the attacks on Spanish naval ports. After the peace at Amiens, Sorell was captain in the 18th or Royal Irish Regiment, and in 1804 was promoted major to the 43rd regiment. In 1807 he was made deputy-adjutant-general of the forces at the Cape of Good Hope, and was promoted brevet lieutenant-colonel. He returned to England in 1811 and on 4 February 1813 retired from the army. 

Sorell had married Louisa Matilda, daughter of Lieutenant-General Cox, but had separated from his wife in 1807 before going to South Africa. There he formed a connection with the wife of a Lieutenant Kent serving in one of the regiments, and it is believed that this was the reason for his being retired. On 3 April 1816 Sorell was appointed governor of Tasmania, arrived in Sydney on 10 March 1817 aboard the ship Sir William Bensley, and at Hobart on 8 April 1817. In the meanwhile Lieutenant Kent had brought an action against Sorell "for criminal conversation with the plaintiff's wife", and on 5 July 1817 was awarded £3000 damages.

Van Diemen's Land
William Sorell took over from Thomas Davey on 9 April 1817 with the colony in disarray. He reported that the island was in a 'long disordered state from a Banditti which has subsisted for years'. Punishment for serious offences were difficult due to the vast distances the convict and settler would have to cover in order to get to the court of criminal judicature in Hobart. The police force was also inept, due to it being made up of convicts as the rate of pay it provided was too low for the service of respectable people.

In his 7 years as lieutenant-governor, Sorell did a good job at cleaning up the colony. It was under Sorell that Michael Howe's bushranger-gang was broken with most of its members hanged, returning order to much of the island including the upper Derwent and Clyde river area which contained the colonies richest farmland. Sorell systemised land grants and cleaned up the woeful bookkeeping he had inherited from Davey, reducing corruption and under the table deals between government officials and the settlers.

The masterpiece that Sorell would always be known for, however, was the foundation of the Macquarie Harbour Penal Settlement in 1821, a place he referred to as for 'ultra banishment and punishment' for convicts whom were in danger of becoming bushrangers and had committed secondary crimes in the colony. The settlement became a benchmark of punishment in the British Empire, playing a key role in keeping the convicts of Van Diemen's Land submissive, even though the convict population had risen from 18% of the white population in 1817 at the start of Sorell's term to 58% of the white population in 1822, just before he was recalled. Mount Sorell and Cape Sorell which tower over and surround Macquarie Harbour and its penal colony are named after him.

Sorell was recalled from hs role as Lieutenant-governor on 26 August 1823. His successor, Lieutenant-governor George Arthur, arrived on 12 May 1824; Sorell left for England on 12 June 1824. He was given a pension of £500 a year and died on 4 June 1848. There were several children of his marriage and of his relationship with Mrs Kent who had followed him to the colony, one of whom, William Sorell, junior, was appointed registrar of the Supreme Court of Tasmania at Hobart in 1824, and held this position until his death in 1860. Sorell junior's daughter, Julia, married Tom Arnold and became the mother of the novelist Mary Augusta Ward, the author Ethel Arnold, the scholar Julia Huxley (herself the mother of Julian Huxley and Aldous Huxley) and the journalist and writer William Thomas Arnold.

References

Hughes, Robert, The Fatal Shore, London, Pan, 1988.

Further reading
 
 Robson, L. L. (1983). A History of Tasmania. Volume I. Van Diemen's Land From the Earliest Times to 1855. Melbourne: Oxford University Press. .

1775 births
1848 deaths
Royal Irish Regiment (1684–1922) officers
43rd Regiment of Foot officers
British Army personnel of the French Revolutionary Wars
British Army personnel of the Napoleonic Wars
Governors of Tasmania
Australian penal colony administrators
Van Diemen's Land people
19th-century Australian public servants